Georges Brosteaux (2 January 1902 – 13 November 1959) was a Belgian racing cyclist. He rode in the 1927 Tour de France.

References

1902 births
1959 deaths
Belgian male cyclists
Place of birth missing